St James's Square in Bath, Somerset, England consists of 45 Grade I listed buildings. It was built in 1793 by John Palmer.

It is the only complete Georgian square in Bath. Each of the 3 storey houses has a mansard roof. The central buildings have pediments on 4 Corinthian pilasters.

In 1840 number 35 was the home of Charles Dickens.

See also

 List of Grade I listed buildings in Bath and North East Somerset

References

Houses completed in 1793
Grade I listed buildings in Bath, Somerset
Streets in Bath, Somerset